The 2020–21 season was the 75th season in HNK Rijeka’s history. It was their 30th successive season in the Croatian First Football League, and 47th successive top tier season.

Competitions

Overall

HT Prva liga

League table

Results summary

Results by round

Results by opponent

Source: 2020–21 Croatian First Football League article

UEFA Europa League

Group stage

Matches

HT Prva liga

Source: Croatian Football Federation

Croatian Cup

Source: Croatian Football Federation

UEFA Europa League

Source: uefa.com

Friendlies

Mid-season

On-season

Player seasonal records
Updated 23 May 2021. Competitive matches only.

Goals

Source: Competitive matches

Clean sheets

Source: Competitive matches

Disciplinary record

Source: nk-rijeka.hr

Appearances and goals

Source: nk-rijeka.hr

Suspensions

Penalties

Overview of statistics

Transfers

In

Source: Glasilo Hrvatskog nogometnog saveza

Out

Source: Glasilo Hrvatskog nogometnog saveza

Spending:  €0
Income:  €9,600,000
Expenditure:  €9,600,000

Notes

References

External links

HNK Rijeka seasons
Rijeka